, son of regent Masamoto, was a kugyō or Japanese court noble of the Muromachi period (1336–1573). He held a regent position kampaku from 1501 to 1513. Tanemichi was his son.

Family
Father: Kujō Masamoto
Mother: Jusanmi Tomoko
Wife: Sanjōnishi Yasuko
Children (all by Sanjōnishi Yasuko):
Kujō Tanemichi
 Kazanin Iesuke (1519–1580)
 son (尋円)
 Tsuneko married Nijō Korefusa
 Ooka Zenkichi

References

 

1469 births
1530 deaths
Fujiwara clan
Kujō family